Fotografiska is a centre for contemporary photography in the Södermalm district of Stockholm, Sweden that was founded by brothers Jan and Per Broman and opened on 21 May 2010. In March 2021, it merged with NeueHouse and is operated by Yoram Roth and Josh Wyatt under the parent company CultureWorks.

Details
Fotografiska is housed at Stadsgården, in a former customs house in the Art Nouveau style dating from 1906 and has amenities typical of a museum: exhibit space, bistro, café, bar, conference rooms, museum shop, gallery, and event spaces. As of 2020, it drew more than 500,000 visitors each year. Designed by Ferdinand Boberg, the building is listed as of cultural interest.

Among the exhibitions it has shown are: Annie Leibovitz, A Photographer's Life, May 21 – September 19, 2010Gus Van Sant, One Step Big Shot, November 9 – December 5, 2010,  and Robert Mapplethorpe, Retrospective, June 17 – October 3, 2011.

Other locations

, a separate Stockholm museum of photography, operated from 1971 to 1998, when it was integrated into Moderna museet.

Fotografiska Tallinn in Tallinn, Estonia opened in June 2019.

Fotografiska New York opened in December 2019 at the former church mission house in Gramercy, a historical landmark building.

Fotografiska announced plans for a London location, but those plans were cancelled by the COVID pandemic. A Berlin location is scheduled to open in 2023.

References

External links

Exhibitions in Sweden
2010 establishments in Sweden
Photography museums and galleries in Sweden
Art Nouveau architecture in Stockholm
Art Nouveau government buildings